Empire is an American musical drama television series which debuted on Fox on January 7, 2015. The show centers around a hip hop music and Entertainment Company, Empire Records, and the drama among the members of the founders' family as they fight for control of the company. The series was created by Lee Daniels and Danny Strong, and stars Terrence Howard and Taraji P. Henson. The series' sixth and final season premiered on September 24, 2019, and concluded on April 21, 2020.

Series overview

Episodes

Season 1 (2015)

Season 2 (2015–16)

Season 3 (2016–17)

Season 4 (2017–18)

Season 5 (2018–19)

Season 6 (2019–20)

Ratings

References

External links

Empire (2015 TV series)
Lists of American drama television series episodes